{{safesubst:#invoke:RfD||2=Akademitscheski nautschno-isdatelski, proiswodstwenno-poligrafitscheski i knigorasprostranitelski zentr Rossijskoi akademii nauk "Isdatelstwo Nauka"|month = March
|day =  9
|year = 2023
|time = 22:07
|timestamp = 20230309220727

|content=
redirect Nauka (publisher) 

}}